The Anaweka River is small river in a remote area of the Tasman District of New Zealand. Its source is on the slopes of Mount White in the Wakamarama Range.

See also
List of rivers of New Zealand

References
Land Information New Zealand - Search for Place Names

Rivers of the Tasman District
Rivers of New Zealand